William Wilson, is an Australian professional footballer who plays as a central midfielder for Melbourne Victory.

Club career
He made his professional debut in a FFA Cup playoff match against Perth Glory on 24 November 2021. On 16 February 2022 he made first league appearance for Melbourne Victory against Western Sydney Wanderers. Wilson made his starting debut for the club in a 2-1 loss to Central Coast Mariners on the 2022 New Year's Eve fixture.

References

External links

Living people
Australian soccer players
Association football midfielders
Melbourne Victory FC players
National Premier Leagues players
Year of birth missing (living people)